Cadwallader Wolseley (12 February 18064 November 1872) was an Irish Anglican priest, Archdeacon of Glendalough from 1862 until his death.

Wolseley was educated at Trinity College, Dublin. He was Chaplain of the Female Orphan House in Dublin; and later held the living at St Andrew, Lucan.

References

Alumni of Trinity College Dublin
Archdeacons of Glendalough
19th-century Irish Anglican priests
People from Halesworth
1806 births
1872 deaths